WRFY-FM (102.5 MHz) is a commercial FM radio station in Reading, Pennsylvania, calling itself "Y102". The station is owned by iHeartMedia through licensee iHM Licenses, LLC, and broadcasts an AC radio format.  The studios and offices are on Perkiomen Avenue in Reading.

WRFY-FM has an effective radiated power (ERP) of 10,000 watts.  Its transmitter tower is located on the east side of Reading on Neversink Mountain. The station's signal covers the cities of Lancaster, Allentown and Pottsville and the northwestern suburbs of Philadelphia.  WRFY-FM broadcasts using HD Radio technology.  Its HD-2 digital subchannel carries a Spanish-language contemporary hits format known as "Rumba 92.3.," which feeds FM translator W222BY.

History
On September 23, 1962, the station first signed on the air.  It was owned by the City Broadcasting Company as a stand-alone FM station.  (In that era, most FM stations were co-owned with AM or TV stations but WRFY-FM was not.)  Its original studios were in Mount Penn.

By the 1970s, it had raised its power to 42,000 watts. Its tower is 807 feet HAAT.)  It carried a beautiful music format, with quarter hour sweeps of instrumental cover versions of popular adult songs, including Broadway and Hollywood show tunes.  It was an affiliate of the ABC FM Network.

By the 1980s, it had switched to a Top 40 format.  It was affiliated with the RKO Radio Network for news and features.  Over time, it moved in a more adult direction, making the transition to Hot Adult Contemporary music.

In 1996, WRFY-FM was acquired by Clear Channel Communications, along with WRAW 1340 AM.  In 2008, Clear Channel changed its name to iHeartMedia.

Translator
WRFY-HD2 programming is broadcast on the following translator:

See also
Media in the Lehigh Valley

References

External links

RFY-FM
IHeartMedia radio stations
Radio stations established in 1962
1962 establishments in Pennsylvania
Hot adult contemporary radio stations in the United States